Transport in the Republic of Congo  includes land, air and water modes. Over  of paved roads are in use. The two international airports are Maya-Maya Airport and Pointe Noire Airport. 

The country also has a large port on the Atlantic Ocean at Pointe-Noire, others along the Congo River at Brazzaville and Impfondo.

Railways

The 510 km Congo-Ocean Railway connects Brazzaville and Pointe-Noire. The road uses a 1.067-m gauge.

Timeline
In 2003, concessioning occurred.

In 2006, rail service was suspended by floods and oil shortages.

On 12 April 2007, a South Korean consortium agreed to build a new 800 km railway in the Congo-Brazzaville Republic in return for timber concessions.  The railway would connect Brazzaville to Ouesso in the northwest Sangha region.  A two-year feasibility study would take place before a final agreement with the government and starting construction work on the railway.

Highways
Highways span 23,324 km. 3,111 km are paved.

17,000 km of the Congo's railways are classified as national, departmental, and routes of local interest. 6,324 km are non-classified routes.

The National Highway Network includes:

N1 Brazzaville - Kinkala - Dolisie - Pointe Noire
N2 Brazzaville - Owando - Ouésso
N3 Dolisie - Border with Gabon

Waterways

The Congo and Ubangi (Oubangui) rivers provide 1,120 km of commercially navigable water transport. Other rivers are used for local traffic.

Pipelines
The country has oil (982 km), gas (232 km) and liquid petroleum gas (4km) pipeline networks.

Ports and harbours

Atlantic Ocean
Pointe-Noire (Major seaport)

Congo River
Brazzaville (River port)
Impfondo
Djeno (Oil terminal)

Other rivers
Oyo

Sangha River
Ouesso

Air

The Republic of the Congo has two international airports: Maya-Maya Airport in Brazzaville and Pointe Noire Airport. As of June 2014, six airlines operated between the two airports. Both airports had direct flights to Addis Ababa, Abidjan, Casablanca, Cotonou, Douala, Libreville, Johannesburg, and Paris. Maya-Maya Airport is served by more airlines than Pointe Noire and had direct flights to various other destinations in Africa and the Middle East.

The country hosts 8 airports with paved runways. Five have runways shorter than 2,437 meters. 1 is less than 3,047 meters, while 2 have longer runways.Ten airports have unpaved runways. Two have runways shorter than 914 meters. Nine have runways shorter than 1,523 meters, while 8 have runways as long as 2,437 meters.

See also
 Republic of the Congo

References